{{DISPLAYTITLE:C6H12O6}}

The molecular formula C6H12O6 (molar mass: 180.16 g/mol) may refer to:

Hexoses
Aldohexoses
Allose
Altrose
Galactose
Glucose
Dextrose (D-Glucose)
L-Glucose
Gulose
Idose
Mannose
Talose
Ketohexoses
Fructose
Psicose
Sorbose
Tagatose
Isosaccharinic acid
Inositols
allo-Inositol
cis-Inositol
chiro-Inositol (1R-chiro-Inositol)
1D-chiro-Inositol
1L-chiro-Inositol
epi-Inositol
muco-Inositol
neo-Inositol
scyllo-Inositol